Southside Mall may refer to:
South Side Mall (South Williamson, Kentucky)
Southside Mall (Oneonta, New York)